Aerials is a 2016 Emirati science fiction film set in the city of Dubai, United Arab Emirates. Directed by S. A. Zaidi and produced by Ghanem Ghubash, it is the first science fiction film made in UAE. It portrays an alien invasion over the city of Dubai. It stars Saga Alyasery, Ana Druzhynina, Mansoor Alfeeli, and Mohammad Abu Diak.

Premise 

Earth is invaded by aliens from outer space. An multiracial couple living in the city of Dubai are confined to their home due to the uncertainty of the situation. Disconnected from the world outside due to the loss of communication, they explore around their cultural differences in science in order to understand the reason behind aliens coming to our planet, only to find themselves confronted by a pair of extraterrestrial encounters at their home.

Cast 

 Saga Alyasery as Omar
 Ana Druzhynina as Omar's wife
 Mansoor Alfeeli as Marwan
 Mohammad Abu Diak as Guy in car
 Pascale Matar as Sara
 Luke Coutts as Insurance guy
 Abeer Mohammed as Arabic news anchor
 Tamara Ljubibratic as News anchor 1
 Derrik Sweeney as News anchor 2

Release 
The films official trailer was released at Middle East Film and Comic Con Dubai, and IGN Middle East Abu Dhabi. The film was released in cinemas of United Arab Emirates on June 16, 2016. The film was internationally released in May 2020 on Netflix.

References

External links 
 

2016 films
Emirati science fiction films
2010s Arabic-language films
2010s English-language films
English-language Emirati films
Films set in Dubai
Films shot in Dubai
Unidentified flying objects
2016 science fiction films
Emirati multilingual films
2016 multilingual films